Liscomb can be one of the following places:
 Liscomb, Iowa
 Liscomb, Nova Scotia
 Liscomb Mills, Nova Scotia
 Liscomb Sanctuary, Nova Scotia
  Liscomb Game Sanctuary